Elachista encumeadae is a moth of the family Elachistidae that is endemic to Madeira.

There are at least two generations per year.

The larvae feed on Festuca donax. They mine the leaves of their host plant.

References

encumeadae
Moths described in 2002
Endemic fauna of Madeira
Moths of Africa